The  superyacht Wedge Too was launched by Feadship in 2002. French designer Philippe Starck, designed both the interior and exterior of Wedge Too.

Design 
She was built to ABS A1 Yachting Service, AMS classification society rules. She is registered in the Cayman Islands.

Engines 
She is powered by twin 1,581 hp Caterpillar 3512B DITA engines.

See also
 List of motor yachts by length
 List of yachts built by Feadship

References

2002 ships
Motor yachts
Ships built in the Netherlands